The 2020 AFC U-23 Championship was the fourth edition of the AFC U-23 Championship, the biennial international age-restricted football championship organised by the Asian Football Confederation (AFC) for the men's under-23 national teams of Asia. A total of 16 teams competed in the tournament. It took place between 8–26 January 2020 in Thailand.

The tournament acted as the AFC qualifiers for the 2020 Summer Olympics men's football tournament. The top three teams of the tournament would qualify for the Olympics in Japan as the AFC representatives. As Japan had already qualified as the hosts, had they reached the semi-finals, the other semi-finalists were guaranteed qualification even before the phase would have commenced.

Uzbekistan were the defending champions, but were eliminated in the semi-finals. South Korea became the fourth different country to win the tournament, beating Saudi Arabia in the final, while Australia defeated Uzbekistan in the third place game 1–0.

Host selection
Several nations expressed interest to host the tournament, including Australia, Malaysia, Thailand and Vietnam. Thailand were selected as host of the competition at an AFC Competition Committee's meeting in Tokyo in August 2018.

Qualification

The qualifiers were held from 18 to 26 March 2019, during the FIFA International Match Calendar.

Qualified teams
Thirteen of the sixteen teams (including hosts Thailand) that qualified for 2018 AFC U-23 Championship qualified again for the 2020 final tournament. The 2013 champions Iraq, 2016 champions Japan, 2018 champions Uzbekistan all qualified for the 2020 final tournament. The teams: Iraq, Japan, Uzbekistan, Jordan, Syria, Saudi Arabia, North Korea, South Korea, China PR, Australia qualified for all editions of AFC U-23 Championship till 2020.

Iran, United Arab Emirates come back after missing out in 2018, with Bahrain making their debut at the tournament finals.

The following 16 teams qualified for the final tournament.

Venues
The competition was played in four venues across four cities/provinces.

Draw
The draw of the final tournament was held on 26 September 2019, 15:00 ICT (UTC+7), at the Swissotel Bangkok Ratchada in Bangkok. The 16 teams were drawn into four groups of four teams. The teams were seeded according to their performance in the 2018 AFC U-23 Championship final tournament and qualification, with the hosts Thailand automatically seeded and assigned to Position A1 in the draw.

Match officials
On 3 January 2020, the AFC announced the list of referees chosen for the 2020 AFC U-23 Championship. 34 referees, 26 assistant referees and 2 support assistant referees were appointed for the tournament. Video assistant referees will be used in this tournament.

Referees

  Chris Beath
  Shaun Evans
  Nawaf Shukralla
  Fu Ming
  Ma Ning
  Liu Kwok Man
  Alireza Faghani
  Ali Sabah
  Mohanad Qasim
  Jumpei Iida
  Hiroyuki Kimura
  Ryuji Sato
  Minoru Tōjō
  Adham Makhadmeh
  Ahmed Al-Ali
  Kim Hee-gon
  Kim Jong-hyeok
  Ko Hyung-jin
  Mohd Amirul Izwan Yaacob
  Ahmed Al-Kaf
  Abdulla Al-Marri
  Abdulrahman Al-Jassim
  Khamis Al-Kuwari
  Khamis Al-Marri
  Turki Al-Khudhayr
  Muhammad Taqi
  Hettikamkanamge Perera
  Hanna Hattab
  Sivakorn Pu-udom
  Ammar Al-Jeneibi
  Mohammed Abdulla Hassan Mohamed
  Omar Mohamed Al-Ali
  Valentin Kovalenko
  Ilgiz Tantashev

Assistant referees

  Anton Shchetinin
  Ashley Beecham
  Mohamed Salman
  Abdulla Al-Rowaimi
  Cao Yi
  Shi Xiang
  Mohammadreza Abolfazl
  Mohammadreza Mansouri
  Ahmad Al-Roalle
  Mohammad Al-Kalaf
  Jun Mihara
  Hiroshi Yamauchi
  Park Sang-jun
  Yoon Kwang-yeol
  Abu Bakar Al-Amri
  Rashid Al-Ghaithi
  Saud Al-Maqaleh
  Taleb Al-Marri
  Mohammed Al-Abakry
  Khalaf Al-Shammari
  Ronnie Koh Min Kiat
  Palitha Hemathunga
  Mohamed Al-Hammadi
  Hasan Al-Mahri
  Timur Gaynullin
  Andrey Tsapenko

Support assistant referees

  Mohd Yusri Muhamad
  Rawut Nakarit

Squads

Players born on or after 1 January 1997 were eligible to compete in the tournament. Each team had to register a squad of minimum 18 players and maximum 23 players, minimum three of whom must have been goalkeepers (Regulations Articles 24.1 and 24.2).

Group stage
The top two teams of each group advanced to the quarter-finals.

Tiebreakers
Teams are ranked according to points (3 points for a win, 1 point for a draw, 0 points for a loss), and if tied on points, the following tiebreaking criteria are applied, in the order given, to determine the rankings (Regulations Article 9.3):
Points in head-to-head matches among tied teams;
Goal difference in head-to-head matches among tied teams;
Goals scored in head-to-head matches among tied teams;
If more than two teams are tied, and after applying all head-to-head criteria above, a subset of teams are still tied, all head-to-head criteria above are reapplied exclusively to this subset of teams;
Goal difference in all group matches;
Goals scored in all group matches;
Penalty shoot-out if only two teams are tied and they met in the last round of the group;
Disciplinary points (yellow card = 1 point, red card as a result of two yellow cards = 3 points, direct red card = 3 points, yellow card followed by direct red card = 4 points);
Drawing of lots.

All times are local, ICT (UTC+7).

Group A

Group B

Group C

Group D

Knockout stage
In the knockout stage, extra time and penalty shoot-out were used to decide the winner if necessary (Regulations Articles 12.1 and 12.2).

Bracket

Quarter-finals

Semi-finals
The winners qualified for the 2020 Summer Olympics.

Third place match
The winner qualified for the 2020 Summer Olympics.

Final

Winners

Awards
The following awards were given at the conclusion of the tournament:

Goalscorers

Tournament team rankings

Qualified teams for the Summer Olympics
The following four teams from the AFC qualified for the 2020 Summer Olympic men's football tournament, including Japan which qualified as the hosts.

1 Italic indicates hosts for that year.
2 Australia qualified as a member of the OFC for six tournaments between 1956 and 2004.

Notes

References

External links
 , the-AFC.com
 AFC U-23 Championship 2020, stats.the-AFC.com

 
2020
Football at the 2020 Summer Olympics – Men's qualification
2020
2020 in Asian football
AFC
2020
January 2020 sports events in Asia